Dudley Colin Suttor (10 April 1892 – 15 April 1962) was a rugby union player who represented Australia.

Suttor, a wing, was born in Cowra, New South Wales and claimed a total of 3 international rugby caps for Australia.

References

                   

Australian rugby union players
Australia international rugby union players
People from Cowra
1892 births
1962 deaths
Rugby union players from New South Wales
Rugby union wings